Faustina ( 361 – after 366) was an Empress of the Roman Empire and third wife of Emperor Constantius II. The main source for her biography is the account of historian Ammianus Marcellinus. Her origins and other names are unknown.

Marriage
Constantius married her in Antioch in 361, after the death of his second wife, Eusebia in 360. Ammianus simply reports that the marriage took place while Constantius was wintering in Antioch, taking a break from the ongoing Roman–Persian Wars. "At that same time Constantius took to wife Faustina, having long since lost Eusebia".

She was pregnant when Constantius died on 3 November 361 and later gave birth to their posthumous daughter, Flavia Maxima Constantia, the only child of the emperor. Constantia later married Emperor Gratian.

Widow
On 28 September 365 Procopius declared himself emperor in Constantinople, intending to depose the incumbent emperor Valens. The usurper's strongest claim to the throne was his kinship with the revered Constantinian dynasty, and he emphasized this link by keeping Faustina and her little daughter constantly near him in his public appearances.

Ammianus considers that Procopius having Faustina and Constantia by his side increased the loyalty of the people to his cause:

After the Battle of Thyatira and the fall of Procopius in 366, Faustina passes out of sight.

References

External links
Her profile in the "Prosopography"

4th-century Roman empresses
Constantinian dynasty
Romans from unknown gentes
Constantius II